Diapheridae is a family of air-breathing land snails, terrestrial pulmonate gastropod mollusks in the superfamily Streptaxoidea. 

Sutcharit et al. (2010) established the new family Diapheridae within the superfamily Streptaxoidea in 2010.

Genera
The family Diapheridae includes :
 Bruggennea Dance, 1972
 Diaphera Albers, 1850
 Laoennea Páll-Gergely, 2020
 Parasinoennea Z.-Y. Chen & Páll-Gergely, 2020
 Platycochlium Laidlaw, 1950
 Platylennea Páll-Gergely, 2020
 Pupennea Páll-Gergely, 2020
 Rowsonia Páll-Gergely, 2020
 Sinoennea Kobelt, 1904
 Tonkinia Mabille, 1887
Synonym
 Diaphora Martens, 1860 accepted as Diaphera Albers, 1850 (unjustified emendation of the original name)

References

External links 
 Páll-Gergely, B., Hunyadi, A., Grego, J., Sajan, S., Tripathy, B. & Chen, Z.-Y. [Zheyu. (2020). A review of the Diapheridae (Gastropoda: Eupulmonata: Streptaxoidea), with special emphasis on India and Myanmar. Raffles Bulletin of Zoology. 68: 682–718]